Sultan is a 2008 Indian Malayalam-language film directed by Sreeprakash, starring Vinu Mohan and Varada in the lead roles.

Plot 
Sivan is a medical college student better known in the campus as "Sultan" as he was considered by all as the "Sultan of Romance". He and his four childhood close friends  Naufal, Sunny and Vivek form a gang in the campus and they become quite popular among the students.

Sivan is in love with Nishitha, who is also a student in the same college. Their love has been accepted by their families and they have been engaged to marry after the completion of their studies. Things take a turn when Sivan's pet-name Sultan puts him in some totally unexpected situations.

Cast 
 Vinu Mohan as Sivan
 Varada as Nishitha
 Sarayu as Neena
 R. J. Praveen Krishna as Sunny
 Anoop Chandran as Naufal
 Sreejith Ravi as Vivek
 Shammi Thilakan
 Reshmi Boban as Dr. 
 Lalu Alex
 Jagathy Sreekumar
 Salim Kumar
 Vijayaraghavan
 Joju George
 Mustafizur Rahman 
 Harish Siva

Soundtrack
"Raakuyil koottukari" - Vijay Yesudas, Shweta Mohan
"Maa Mazha Maha" - Ranjith
"Maa Mazha (Slow)" - Ranjith

References

External links
 
 http://popcorn.oneindia.in/title/462/sulthaan.html

2008 films
2000s Malayalam-language films
Films scored by M. Jayachandran